Dana Stephensen (born 1984–1985) is an Australian ballet dancer. She is a soloist of The Australian Ballet.

Dance career
Stephensen started her dance training at the age of three in Brisbane. In 2001 she joined the Queensland Dance School of Excellence and obtained the Royal Academy of Dance Solo Seal. After becoming an Interstate Associate of The Australian Ballet School, she joined the senior school in 2002. She performed several seasons seconded to The Australian Ballet and joined full-time in 2005. She was promoted to coryphée in 2010 and soloist in 2013.

Stephensen won the Telstra Ballet Dancer Award for 2010, jointly with Ty King-Wall.

Selected repertoire

 Lead Cupid in Molto Vivace, 2010
 Guardian Swan in Graeme Murphy's Swan Lake, 2008–2010
 Kitri in Don Quixote, 2010 (as Guest Artist with Australian touring company The Dancers Company)

Other activities
Stephensen played an Australian Ballet dancer in the 2009 film Mao's Last Dancer.

Personal life
Stephensen has a son, with her former husband Michael Kai.

As of early 2020, Stephensen is engaged to Lachlan Gillespie of the Wiggles, whom she met while filming a Wiggles DVD special in December 2018. They wed in late November 2022.

On 11 September 2020, Stephensen and Gillespie announced via Instagram the arrival of their newborn twin daughters, Lulu and Lottie.

Awards

 Telstra Ballet Dancer Award 2010
 Khitercs Scholarship, 2008
 James and Pamela Mills Scholarship, 2004
 Graeme Murphy Award for Excellence in Contemporary Dance, 2003

References

Australian ballerinas
Dancers of the Australian Ballet
Living people
People from Brisbane
Telstra Ballet Dancer Award winners
Telstra People's Choice Award winners
1980s births